Radio 10 Magic FM is a commercial radio station in Suriname.

Trivia 

Radio 10 "MAGIC" FM is the first radio station broadcasting the exact time in Suriname with the aid of a GPS/DCF computer. This computer manages everything in the studio that involves time and date.

History 
December 10, 2006 / The new face of Radio 10 Magic FM is an idea of Werner Duttenhofer as a gift in celebration of 10 years 10 and was realized by 3 artist namely. Ray Daal, August Bohé & Sojo Prijatno.

Crew 

 Werner Jr. Duttenhofer
 Jerome Duttenhofer
 Elvin Duttenhofer
 Jardell Rose
 Steven van Frederikslust
 Bicham Chandralal
 Gerda Duttenhofer
 Sidney Grunberg
 Raúl Kandhai
 Ryan Rozenblad
 Jennifer Thompson Suriname
 Raynel Dalen
 Ruben Tjopawiro
 Marynho Tanoeleksono
 George Tarsa
 Renuka Girjasing
 Giwani Zeggen
 Maureen Boodie
 Rodney Deekman
 Sandra Mangalie
 Debby Sodikromo

Schedule 

Weekdays
News every hour starting at 06:00 till 8:00 10:00 and 18:00

Saturday
News at 06:00, 07:00, 08:00, 12:00 and 18:00u

Sunday
News at 12:00 and 16:00u

Streaming 
 http://live.radio10.sr/

References

Radio stations in Suriname